Baby Case is a musical with book, music, and lyrics by Michael Ogborn. The show is based on the famous Lindbergh baby kidnapping, commonly known as the "Crime of the Century". The musical, which had its world premiere at the Arden Theatre Company in Philadelphia, has gone on to win multiple awards, including the "Best of Fest" award in the 2012 New York Musical Theatre Festival.

Productions 
The musical originally ran at the Arden Theatre Company in Philadelphia, Pennsylvania as a part of its 2001/2002 season.

The musical had its New York debut in 2012 in the New York Musical Theatre Festival. Direction was by Jeremy Dobrish, with choreography by Warren Adams. The cast consisted of Will Reynolds, Anika Larsen, Melissa van der Schyff, Eugene Barry-Hill, Jason Collins, Hannah Elless, Tom Riis Farrell, Michael Thomas Holmes, Matthew G. Myers, Patricia Noonan, and Kurt Zischke.

Musical numbers 

Act 1
American Hero - Ensemble
Nurse's Song - Betty Gow
Someone's Taken the Lindbergh Baby - Ensemble
To Search for You - Anne Lindbergh and Charles Lindbergh
Lullaby - Anne Lindbergh
Baby Case - William Randolph Hearst, Reporters, and Ensemble
A Picture of You - Photographer and Girls
Pull Over Here - William Allen and Girls
Dirty Dishes - Violet Sharpe
Over the Sea - Charles Lindbergh
Wake Up New York - Walter Winchell, Barry, Lyle, and Ensemble

Act 2
Baby Case (reprise) - Orchestra and Ensemble
Scapegoat - Bruno Hauptmann
Lawsuit Daddy - Mrs. Wilentz, Secretary, and Women
Flemington Jingle - Studio Sisters
Hauptmann Murdered the Lindbergh Baby! - Ensemble
Lucky Locks - Studio Sisters
Hour of Gold - St. Johns and Anne Lindbergh
If That's What Greets a Hero - Millard Whited and Company
Ladder Song - Ladder Lady
No, I Never Did - Bruno Hauptmann
Trial Drinking Song - Reporters and Ensemble
Unmerciful Hearts - Anna Hauptmann
Invitation to an Execution - Men
Execution March - Ensemble
One Little Boy - Anne Lindbergh
Over, Said, and Done - Ensemble

Reception 
In her review of the New York Musical Theatre Festival production, Anita Gates of the New York Times wrote: "This production has rousing songs, big voices, stylish staging and choreography, first-rate lighting and handsome period costumes. And framing it with the radio bulletins of Walter Winchell (Michael Thomas Holmes), the celebrity-gossip king of his day, was a smart idea." The Huffington Post review wrote: "We were both overwhelmed by Ogborn's wit, juxtaposition of historical elements, his range of you-can't-keep-your-toes-from-tapping syncopation, his you-actually-walk-out-humming-them melodies and his handling of a complex and complicated subject...a cut above the original. Director Jeremy Dobrish deserves an E for Exceptionallly Excellent for his revisions."

Awards and nominations 
The musical received four Barrymore Awards for Excellence in Theater in 2002, including Best Musical. In 2012, it received four NYMF awards, including Best of Fest.

References

2002 musicals
Cultural depictions of Charles Lindbergh
Lindbergh kidnapping
Musicals inspired by real-life events